A zero register is a processor register that always returns the value zero. It is found primarily in high-performance instruction set architectures, notably the CDC 6600, System/360 and MIPS architecture, among others.

Zero appears as a constant in many instructions, notably "branch if zero", and optimizing these instructions can have a significant positive benefit on performance. Some architectures accomplish this with dedicated opcodes, specialized variations of their basic instructions. Implementing these requires additional logic in the instruction decoder. The zero register can accomplish the same effect without requiring new opcodes, although at the cost of dedicating a register to this feature, which can be expensive in circuitry terms.

References
 

Computer architecture